Miguel Díaz Montes (born 24 January 1994) is a Spanish professional footballer who plays for CD Ebro as a midfielder.

Football career
Born in Estella, Navarre, Díaz joined CA Osasuna's youth setup in 2007 at the age of 13, from CD Izarra. He made his senior debut with the reserves on 9 September 2012, coming on as a second-half substitute for Luis Ali in a 1–4 Segunda División B away loss against Real Zaragoza B.

Díaz scored his first senior goal on 26 January 2014, in a 3–0 away win against CD Murchante in the Tercera División. He finished the campaign with a career-best 18 goals for the B-side, playing a key unit in their promotion back to the third division.

On 11 September 2016, Díaz scored a hat-trick in a 4–2 home win against Arandina CF. The following 13 June, after the first team's relegation from La Liga, he was definitely promoted to the main squad after extending his contract until 2018.

Díaz made his professional debut on 20 September 2017, starting in a 0–1 away loss against Cádiz CF in the season's Copa del Rey. The following 5 January he extended his contract until 2020, but was demoted to the B-side in the third level.

On 21 August 2018, Díaz was loaned to CD Mirandés of the third division for a year. The deal was terminated on 31 January 2019, and Díaz was instead loaned to Real Murcia.

References

External links
Osasuna profile 

1994 births
Living people
People from Estella Oriental
Footballers from Navarre
Spanish footballers
Association football midfielders
Segunda División B players
Tercera División players
CA Osasuna B players
CA Osasuna players
CD Mirandés footballers
Real Murcia players
CD Tudelano footballers
CD Calahorra players
CF Villanovense players
CD Ebro players